Nikolaos Kamarianos (born March 21, 1997) is a Greek professional basketball player who last played for PAOK of the Greek Basket League and the Basketball Champions League. He is a 2.04 m (6 ft. 8 in.) tall small forward-power forward.

Youth career
Kamarianos played from a young age with the youth teams of Palaio Faliro, Panellinios, and Panathinaikos, before he started his pro career.

Professional career
Kamarianos signed his first professional contract with the Greek Basket League club AEK Athens, on 21 July 2015.

On August 17, 2020, Kamarianos moved to Kolossos Rodou on a two-year contract. On July 3, 2021, he parted ways with the island team.

On August 2, 2021, Kamarianos signed with PAOK. In 18 games, he averaged 3 points and 2.6 rebounds, playing around 10 minutes per contest.

References

External links
EuroCup Profile
Eurobasket.com Profile
Greek Basket League Profile 

1997 births
Living people
AEK B.C. players
Greek men's basketball players
Greek Basket League players
Kolossos Rodou B.C. players
Nea Kifissia B.C. players
Panionios B.C. players
P.A.O.K. BC players
Power forwards (basketball)
Small forwards
Basketball players from Athens